Descriptions des Arts et Métiers, faites ou approuvées par messieurs de l'Académie Royale des Sciences (French for "Descriptions of the Arts and Trades, made under the direction of the gentlemen of the Royal Academy of Sciences"), is a collection of books on crafts that was published by the Parisian Royal Academy of Sciences between 1761 and 1788.  The full series comprises 113 folio volumes along with three supplements, and provide detailed accounts of a wide range of handcraft and manufacturing processes carried out in France at that time. The volumes are well-illustrated, with precise engravings by Jean Elie Bertrand (1737–1779) a noted typographer from Neuchâtel, where the printing was done.  Many of them provide the background for shorter articles in Diderot's Encyclopedia, which was appearing at much the same time.

The project had its origin in request from Colbert in 1675 to the Academy Royal des Sciences for detailed accounts of various mechanic arts to be prepared and for new machines to be reported upon. This led to the formation of the Bignon Commission under Abbé Bignon. René-Antoine Ferchault de Réaumur (1683–1757) became editor soon after he joined the academy. He inherited  number of drawings (the earliest prepared in 1693) and an illustrated manuscript on printing, type and book binding, which had been prepared in 1704. It was left to Réaumur's successor Duhamel du Monceau to bring about the publication of the series, probably as the result of the competition from the Encyclopedia.

The articles and engravings in the Descriptions are more detailed and accurate than those in the Encyclopedia, and so are of more value for technical historians today. There is evidence that proofs of some 150 plates were stolen by agents of Diderot who had them re-engraved for his project. There is a similarity between many of the plates used in the two works.

The first of the volumes appeared in 1761, and the last in 1788.

Topics covered 
 Building construction
 Clothing
 Shipbuilding
 Fishing
 Woodworking
 Pipe-organ making
 Metal working
 Turning and lathe work
 Scientific-instrument making
 Flour milling
 Baking and sugar refining
 Paper-making and bookbinding
 Tanning and soapmaking
 Wine and vineyards
 Cutlery and surgical instrument making
 Mining and metallurgy
 Porcelain and pottery manufacture
 Painting
 Textile manufacture

In all the series comprises 13,000 pages and 1,804 plates.

This series is an incomparable source of detailed information about the techniques of handicraft and manufacture in the 18th century. A microfilm version is also available from Gale as part of their Seventeenth- and Eighteenth-Century Periodicals and Academy Publications series

References
A. H. Cole and G. B. Watts. The Handicrafts of France, Boston, 1952. It was published by the Baker Library at Harvard.

External links

 Browsable on the BNF (French National Library) Gallica Web site
Full scan: 

And a subset of the plates are viewable on the web site of the l'Istituto Internazionale di Storia Economica "F. Datini"

French non-fiction books
18th-century books
1760s books
1770s books
1780s books